Lich is a town in the district of Gießen, in Hesse, Germany. It is situated 12 km southeast of Gießen. Lich has a population of around 13,000.

Geography

Location
The town is located on the river Wetter halfway between Taunus and Vogelsberg; the northern and eastern parts of the town reside within the natural area of the Vogelsberg, the southern and western in the Wetterau.

Constituent communities
Besides the main town, which bears the same name as the whole municipality, the following surrounding communities belong to Lich since the Gebietsreformen (administrative reorganization) of the 1970s:

History 

The region is known to have been settled for more than 100,000 years. Tools found in several places in and around Lich were dated to the Neanderthal period, others to the Aurignacian culture, Linear Pottery culture, the Bronze Age, the Hallstatt culture and the La Tène culture.

When building the Upper Germanic limes during the reign of the Roman Emperor Domitian the Romans built the Castrum Arnsburg, located near what is now Arnsburg Abbey. It is the most northeastern known full-sized castrum along the limes.

The first known mentioning of Lich dates back to 790 in the Lorsch codex. In 1300 the town was awarded market rights by Emperor Albert I of Germany. Originally belonging to the County of Hagen-Münzenberg it became the property of the Counts of Falkenstein following the marriage of Isengard of Münzenberg to Philip IV of Bolanden-Falkenstein. As an inheritance Lich was given to the House of Solms in the middle of the 14th century. The House of Solms split into several branches over the centuries – one of them the branch Solms-Hohensolms-Lich, which retains its seat in Lich.

There was no significant destruction in Lich during several wars from Thirty Years' War up to World War II. In 1993, the town hosted the 33rd Hessentag state festival.

Governance

Town twinning 
Lich is twinned with the following communities:
 Dieulefit in France
 Tangermünde in Saxony-Anhalt, Germany
 Budakeszi in Hungary
 Vänersborg in Sweden
It is also associated with:
 Tata in Morocco

Landmarks 
 Town centre, made up largely of half-timbered buildings. The most notable is the Textorhaus with its richly carved façade, today hosting the town museum.
 Late Gothic Marienstiftskirche (St Mary's collegiate church) with grave plates and a Baroque pulpit.
 Some parts of the town wall remain. Of the former fortifications the Town Tower (height 48 meters) and the Town Gate are still extant, built at the beginning of the 14th century.
 Castle Lich of the Fürsten (Princes) of Solms-Hohensolms-Lich in late Renaissance and Baroque style, surrounded by a public park.
 Former Cistercian Arnsburg Abbey, about five kilometers southwest of Lich.
 Ober-Bessingen has one of the few remaining Gatehouses.
 Kino Traumstern (cinema) is one of the leading arthouse cinemas of Hesse; it has received several Hessian and German cultural prices over the years.

Education 
There are three elementary schools, a comprehensive school, a special school for children with learning disabilities and a nursing school associated to the Asklepios Klinik Lich. The Gießen district Volkshochschule is also located in Lich.

Economy 

Lich is the home of the brewery and leading regional brand Licher (part of Bitburger Holding). The town also has more than 400 years of tradition in organ building, today represented by the Förster & Nicolaus Orgelbauanstalt and the Otto Heuss GmbH. The Hofapotheke (Court Pharmacy) was founded in 1703.

Gallery

Notable people

Notable people born in Lich
  (1805–1880), politician, President of the First Chamber of the Grand Duchy of Hesse and Deputy of the North German Confederation
  (1805–1878), composer
 Charles of Solms-Hohensolms-Lich (1866–1920), politician, president of the First Chamber of the Estates of the Grand Duchy of Hesse
 Princess Eleonore of Solms-Hohensolms-Lich (1871–1937), wife of Ernest Ludwig, Grand Duke of Hesse and mother-in-law to the Duke of Edinburgh's sister Princess Cecilie of Greece and Denmark 
  (1935–2014), publicist
  (b. 1937), Germanist, professor of communication studies
 Hermann Otto Solms (b. 1940), politician (FDP), up to 22 October 2013 Vice President of the Deutscher Bundestag.
  (b. 1978), former member of the German Women's National Basketball Team
 Stefan Koch (b. 1964), Germany's 2000 and 2005 Basketball Bundesliga Coach of the Year
 Benjamin Lense (b. 1978), footballer in the German Bundesliga
 Aylin Aslım (b. 1975), rock singer and actor

Notable people connected to Lich
 Daniel Hisgen (1733–1812), painter of the Rococo period
 Hermann of Solms-Hohensolms-Lich (1838–1899), politician
  (1892–1986), silhouette artist and co-founder of the Darmstädter Sezession
 Anne-Eva Brauneck (1910–2007), first female German criminal law professor
  (1932–2010), professor of health informatics and founder of the German Cancer Registry
 Karl Starzacher (b. 1945), politician of the SPD, 1991–1995 President of the Landtag of Hesse and Finance Minister from 1995 to 1999 
 Thorsten Schäfer-Gümbel (b. 1969), politician (SPD), current leader of the opposition SPD party bloc in the Landtag of Hesse
 Markus Wach, musician.

References

External links 

 Municipal website
 

Giessen (district)